The HXD2C is a 6 axle Co′Co′ freight locomotive which shares a similar exterior design with the HXD2B. The individually inverter controlled traction motors, body structure overall structural design also are the same as other members of the series; with  transformers from ABB. The HXD2C locomotives are constructed by CNR Datong.

220 units were ordered in 2010 at a cost of over 3 billion Yuan. In May 2010 the first locomotive was produced. Locomotives are expected to be used on the Shijiazhuang–Taiyuan railway line, used for coal trains from Shanxi, with the first train running in December 2010.

References

External links

Electric locomotives of China
CNR Datong Electric Locomotive Co. locomotives
Alstom Prima electric locomotives
25 kV AC locomotives
Standard gauge locomotives of China
Co′Co′ locomotives
Co-Co locomotives